Rehrersburg is a census-designated place in Tulpehocken Township in northwestern Berks County, Pennsylvania, United States, near Pennsylvania Route 419.  The community was founded on April 4, 1803, by John Jacob Rehrer.  Residents celebrated the town's bicentennial on Saturday, September 20, 2003.  As of the 2010 census, the population was 319 residents.

In 1818, the sixth post office in the county opened in Rehrersburg.  Rehrersburg's ZIP code is 19550.

John Jacob Rehrer was the son of Johan Gottfried Rehrer and Maria Magdalena (Etschberger) Rehrer.  Many descendants of the Rehrer family still reside in Rehrersburg.

See also
South Mountain Railroad

References

The Historical Society of Berks County - Archived Issues of News Bits

External links

The Historical Society of Berks County

Census-designated places in Berks County, Pennsylvania
Census-designated places in Pennsylvania